Calce may refer to:

People
 Giacinto della Calce (1649–1715), Italian bishop
 Michael Calce (born 1984), Canadian hacker

Places
 Calce, Pyrénées-Orientales, France

Other
 Center for Advanced Life Cycle Engineering